

Medal table

Lebanese medals by sport

Lebanese Medal winners

Note 1: there must be a 14th bronze according to the medal tables

Note 2: Michel skaff won the silver in the 87 free wrestling and the bronze in the 87 kg Greco-Roman

Note 3: however, Asad EID won 2 bronzes in the free wrestling 67 kg and grecoroman 79 kg ?? either there is an error, or there's 2 Asad eid.

Medalists

External links
 https://web.archive.org/web/20130728095829/http://www.cijm.org.gr/images/stories/pdf/JM1951.pdf

Nations at the 1951 Mediterranean Games
Lebanon at the Mediterranean Games
1951 in Lebanese sport